The 2016–17 Tahiti Ligue 1 is the 70th season of top-flight football in Tahiti. Tefana are the defending champions having won their fourth title last season.

League table

Championship playoff

Semi-finals
Winners qualified for 2018 OFC Champions League.

Final

References

External links
French Polynesia 2016/17, RSSSF.com

Tahiti Ligue 1 seasons
Tahiti
Tahiti
Ligue 1
Ligue 1